The European Athletics Festival Bydgoszcz is an annual track and field meeting held at the Zdzisław Krzyszkowiak Stadium in Bydgoszcz, Poland in early June.

The European Athletics Festival was first held in 2001. The meeting is currently part of the European Athletics Outdoor Premium Meetings series.

World records
Over the course of its history, one world record has been set at the European Athletics Festival.

Meet records

Men

Women

Notes

References

External links
Official website
Meeting records

European Athletic Association meetings
Athletics competitions in Poland
Recurring sporting events established in 2001
Sport in Bydgoszcz